Bobby Keith Moreland (born May 2, 1954), nicknamed "Zonk", is a former outfielder, catcher, and infielder in Major League Baseball who played for the Philadelphia Phillies, Chicago Cubs, and San Diego Padres. In 1989, the final year of his career, he played for the Detroit Tigers, then the Baltimore Orioles.  On February 16, 2011, he was named the Cubs' color analyst on WGN-AM and the Cubs Radio Network, replacing Ron Santo. On November 6, 2013, he announced that he was stepping down from his position at WGN Radio to spend more time with his family.

Baseball career 
Moreland graduated from The University of Texas at Austin, and was drafted by the Phillies in the seventh round of the 1975 draft. He started out as a catcher, but the Phillies also played him at third base and first base. He was traded along with Dickie Noles and Dan Larson from the Phillies to the Cubs for Mike Krukow on December 8, 1981. During his time with the Cubs, he was primarily used as a corner outfielder, except in his final year. He was dealt along with Mike Brumley from the Cubs to the Padres for Goose Gossage and Ray Hayward on February 12, 1988. In 1989, playing for American League teams, he also made 80 appearances as a designated hitter.

Moreland was acquired by the Orioles from the Tigers for Brian Dubois on July 28, 1989. The Orioles needed a power hitter for its pennant drive and settled for Moreland after its failed pursuit of Harold Baines. Prior to an 11–1 loss to the Chicago White Sox at Memorial Stadium on September 12, a frustrated Moreland, who at the time was mired in a .212 slump with one home run and 10 RBI in 104 at-bats in 30 games since joining the ball club, complained, "I'm not going to hit anymore. My career is over." Orioles manager Frank Robinson responded, "If he wants to retire, retire now. If he's not going to retire, he should be here keeping himself ready to go out and do whatever I ask." The misunderstanding was resolved by the team before it became a bigger distraction. Moreland eventually retired as an active player after the conclusion of the season.

Moreland played twelve seasons in Major League Baseball. He helped the Cubs win the 1984 National League Eastern Division championship. His best year was in 1985 with the Cubs, when he batted .307 (14 HR, 106 RBI, 12 SB). He also had a good year in 1987, with 27 HR and 88 RBI. In 1988 as a member of the San Diego Padres, he was the last player to wear #6 before it was retired in honor of Steve Garvey. He is inducted in Texas Longhorn Hall of Honor.
Position: Third Base
Inducted: 1985
Hometown: Carrollton, Texas
· Career .388 hitter with UT
· Three-time All-American
· Led UT to three NCAA College World Series berths
· Co-captain of 56-6 national championship team in 1975
· Hit .410 over a 62-game schedule in 1975

Named to College World Series All-Decade Team for the 1970s. Has second most career hits in College World Series history with 23 in 3 years (1973–75), behind only Sam Fuld of Stanford. On May 1, 2010, Moreland's Longhorn number 3 was retired by The University of Texas.

Broadcasting career 
Moreland has worked as a color analyst for the radio broadcasts of Texas Longhorn football and baseball, as he is a former player for both teams. He has also worked as an occasional fill-in analyst for the Cubs telecasts on WGN-TV, WCIU-TV, and Comcast SportsNet Chicago when regular analyst Bob Brenly wasn't available.

On February 16, 2011, it was announced that Moreland would be the Cubs' full-time radio color analyst on WGN-AM and the Cubs Radio Network, replacing the late Ron Santo. On November 6, 2013, he announced that he was stepping down from his position at WGN Radio to spend more time with his family.

He is now announcing college football games for ASN.

References

External links 

1954 births
Living people
Baltimore Orioles players
Baseball players from Dallas
Chicago Cubs announcers
Chicago Cubs players
College baseball announcers in the United States
Detroit Tigers players
Major League Baseball broadcasters
Major League Baseball catchers
Major League Baseball outfielders
Major League Baseball third basemen
Oklahoma City 89ers players
Peninsula Pilots players
Philadelphia Phillies players
Reading Phillies players
San Diego Padres players
Spartanburg Phillies players
Texas Longhorns baseball players
Texas Longhorns football players
Texas Longhorns football announcers
National College Baseball Hall of Fame inductees
All-American college baseball players
Texas Longhorns baseball coaches